Idde Schultz, Eva Ann-Ida Schultz, (born 1 September 1963) is a Swedish female singer and  guitarist. She is a member of the band Docenterna and former member of Lars Winnerbäck's band Hovet. She is the sister of Irma Schultz Keller. She has scored record successes at the Swedish charts during the mid-late 1990s and the 2000s.

Idde Schultz is a music teacher at Fryshusets gymnasium.

Discography

Sulo & Idde
Kocksgatan Revisited Together with Sören "Sulo" Karlsson 2011

Zzzang Tumb
1982 - 37 Minuter i Stockholms City, Stranded Rekords
1983 - Zzzang Tumb, Stranded Rekords

Torpederna
1993 - Innan himlen faller

Solo
1995 – Idde Schultz
1997 – Vad man gör (och inte gör)

Lars Winnerbäck & Hovet
1998 – Med solen i ögonen
2001 – Singel
2001 – Live för dig
2003 – Söndermarken
2004 – Live i Linköping (concert DVD)
2005 – Stort liv (EP)
2006 – Efter nattens bränder (compilation album)

Hovet
2004 – Hovet 2004

Anna + Idde
2005 – Anna + Idde (EP)
2006 – Vägar hem
2008 – Hjärtat fullt

References 

1963 births
Living people
Women guitarists
Singers from Stockholm
Swedish-language singers
Swedish guitarists
Swedish pop singers